Classic Doom is a generic term used to refer to any of the games in the Doom series based on the original Doom engine, also known as id Tech 1 engine.
It can refer to any of the following:

Doom
Doom II
Final Doom

See also
 Doom Classic